Ignatzschineria larvae is a bacterium from the Ignatzschineria genus which has been isolated from larvae of the flesh fly Wohlfahrtia magnifica at Mezöfalva State Farm in Hungary.

References

Alteromonadales
Bacteria described in 2001